In mathematics, the Lebedev–Milin inequality is any of several inequalities for the coefficients of the exponential of a power series, found by  and . It was used in the proof of the Bieberbach conjecture, as it shows that the Milin conjecture implies the Robertson conjecture.

They state that if

See also exponential formula (on exponentiation of power series).

References

.

 (Translation of the 1971 Russian edition, edited by P. L. Duren).

Inequalities